Nord-5 was Norsk Data's first 32-bit minicomputer, and is believed to be the first 32-bit mini computer. The machine used a Nord-1 as its front-end console processor, which ran the majority of the OS.

Norsk Data minicomputers
32-bit computers